Statistics of Swedish football Division 3 for the 1937–38 season.

League standings

Uppsvenska Östra 1937–38

Uppsvenska Västra 1937–38

Östsvenska 1937–38

Centralserien Norra 1937–38

Centralserien Södra 1937–38

Nordvästra 1937–38

Södra Mellansvenska 1937–38

Sydöstra 1937–38

Västsvenska Norra 1937–38

Västsvenska Södra 1937–38

Sydsvenska 1937–38

Footnotes

References 

Swedish Football Division 3 seasons
3
Sweden